Chhatrapal Singh, also known as Chhatrapal Singh Gangwar, is an Indian social worker, politician, and former minister of state for revenue of Uttar Pradesh. He was a member of the Seventeenth Legislative Assembly of Uttar Pradesh. He represents the Baheri Assembly constituency of Uttar Pradesh and is a member of the Bharatiya Janata Party.

Early life 

Chhatrapal Singh Gangwar was born on 20 January 1956 in Damkhoda, Bareilly, India, to a Hindu family of Ramlal Singh Gangwar. He completed his master's degree in 1979 at Mahatma Jyotiba Phule Rohilkhand University, Bareilly.

Posts held

See also 

 Bharatiya Janata Party
 17th Uttar Pradesh Assembly
 Baheri Assembly constituency

References 

Uttar Pradesh MLAs 2017–2022
People from Bareilly district
1956 births
Living people
Politicians from Bareilly
Bharatiya Janata Party politicians from Uttar Pradesh
Indian Hindus
Members of the Uttar Pradesh Legislative Council